Qaleh Sefid-e Sheykh Hasan (also Romanized as Qal‘eh Sefīd-e Sheykh Ḩasan; also known as Pā’īn Qal‘eh Sefīd and Sheykh Ḩasan) is a village in Qaleh Shahin Rural District, in the Central District of Sarpol-e Zahab County, Kermanshah Province, Iran. In the 2006 census, its population was 278, in 64 families.

References 

Populated places in Sarpol-e Zahab County